Sidharth Malhotra is an Indian actor who appears in Hindi films. He has been featured in Forbes India Celebrity 100 list in 2016 and 2018 and been listed in the Times of India's list since 2013. Malhotra has received the Stardust Award for Breakthrough Performance — Male for Student of the Year and the BIG Star Entertainment Awards for Most Entertaining Actor in a Romantic Film for his performance in the 2014's romantic comedy Hasee Toh Phasee. He received two Screen Awards nominations as  Best Actor — Popular Choice for Ek Villain and  Filmfare Award for Best Male Debut for Student of the Year. He won the Powerhouse Performer of the Year at Nickelodeon Kids' Choice Awards for biographical war film Shershah.

Awards and nominations

Other awards and recognition

References

External links

Sidharth Malhotra awards at IMDb

Lists of awards received by Indian actor